Death Hunt is a 1977 Italian  "poliziottesco" film written and directed  by Tano Cimarosa and starring Al Cliver and Ninetto Davoli.

Plot

Cast    
 
Al Cliver as Inspector Ettore Moretti
Ninetto Davoli as Mario
Martine Carell as Martine
Tano Cimarosa as Tano
Federico Boido as Duilio Brogi  
Zaira Zoccheddu  as Livia 
Nico dei Gabbiani  
 Guia Lauri Filzi as Rosa 
Massimo Mollica as Corsi
Uccio Golino as Marru
Paola Quattrini as Paola Corsi

Reception
Film critic Giovanni Buttafava referred to the film as "a Death Wish of sorts, halfway between the average Turkish epic and a naïve Fassbinder film." Film critic Roberto Curti called it "simply disarming in its naiveness."

See also     
 List of Italian films of 1977

References

External links

Death Hunt at Variety Distribution

Italian crime films
1977 films
1977 crime films
Poliziotteschi films
Films about kidnapping
1970s Italian-language films
1970s Italian films